Pangi is a tehsil of Chamba, Himachal Pradesh, India. The Pangi Valley is a beautiful and poorly developed tribal area, as well as one of the most remote areas in Himachal Pradesh state. The Valley is bordered by
Padder, Jammu and Kashmir in North, Lahaul and Spiti in West and Chamba in Southeast. The Sach Pass at the elevation of 4,414m is the only route connecting Pangi with District headquarter Chamba.

History
People are said to have arrived in the valley thousands of years ago. There are only folk tales and stories indicating human presence in the valley.
It is said that the King of Chamba exiled criminals to the other side of the Sach Pass, where they eventually established civilization.
It is also said that during Mughal attacks, Rajput warriors sent their families into the Himalayan high valleys to protect them, but after they were defeated and killed, their families stayed and populated the region.
One theory holds that people from lower Chenab came here in search of agricultural land

Villages
The Sansari Checkpoint marks the start of the Pangi Valley. Luj is the valley's first village, located at an elevation of 2400 metres. The Dharwas village follows, followed by the villages of Kutha, Anch, Chaloli, and Sural. Killar, the headquarter of Pangi valley is located at an elevation of 2700m along the Chandrabhaga river (Chenab).
The villages Mindhal, Phindru, Sach, Purthi, and Shaor follow.
The valley of Lahaul begins after Tindi.

Transport 
Roads are poor, with few of them surfaced. Pangi is accessible by vehicle all year round via Paddar Valley (Jammu & Kashmir) but it's a long route as one has to go to Jammu and from there to Paddar along the Chenab river valley.

Demographics 
Pangi has 16 panchayats and 54 inhabited villages. 
With recent improvements to the roads, the villagers have started to grow cash crops such as peas, apples and other fruit. The upper reaches of the valley are inhabited by Pangwala and Bhoti people, who are mostly Hindu with a small minority of Buddhists. Attempts are being made to develop the area for tourism, focused on trekking through the dramatic scenery.

Spoken languages 
Basically in pangi two Zones/Belt are their by the divination of their ancestors like Bunush & Bhiyunsh with a little bit difference of language. Language spoken by the Pangi people is Pangwali. Language spoken by Bunush and Bhiyunsh is part of Pangwali. Two linguists are working with Pangi people for Pangwali language development. Phonology, grammar and discourse analysis have been done. Tubari, a Pangwali monthly magazine, is regularly published in the valley. Pangwali literature is under development; some titles are Baau pyar (stories of father's love), a Pangwali-Hindi grammar book and Manihelu, a booklet on proverbs and idioms. All of these materials are available on the Pangi website. In 2013 the debut Pangwali language development website was launched in three languages: Pangwali, Hindi and English.

Tourism 
The Pangi Valley was described by Dr. J Hutchison (in 1904) as follows:
"Pangi is unique in its grandeur and beauty: in this respect far surpassing any other portion of Chamba District. The scenery is sublime and imposing, and nature appears in her wildest and grandest moods. Everything is on a stupendous scale. The great river rolls along In a deep and narrow gorge, lashing itself into fury against the adamantine cliffs that confine it. Precipices spring from the brink, in places almost perpendicular, to a height of one or two thousand feet: on the lower ranges are grassy slopes of rich pasture with dense forests of pine and cedar, while high over all, the stern and majestic mountains, piled on one another, attain in altitude of 18,000 to 21,000 feet rising far beyond the line of eternal snow. But all is not sublimity and grandeur. Every few miles the traveler reaches fairly open nooks of surpassing beauties, which may have been small lakes in some bygone age, while the river was cutting its way through a rocky barrier in front. There the villages are chiefly to be found. These are few in number, and of small size, for the region is sparsely inhabited."

References

Cities and towns in Chamba district
Valleys of Himachal Pradesh